Antona batesii is a moth of the subfamily Arctiinae first described by Felder in 1874. It is found in Guyana and the Amazon basin.

Subspecies
Antona batesii batesii
Antona batesii abdominalis (Bryk, 1953)

References

External links
Reise der Osterreichischen Fregatte Novara um die Erde in der Jahren 1857, 1858, 1859

Lithosiini
Moths described in 1874
Moths of South America